Walton Street is on the eastern edge of the Jericho district of central Oxford, England.

Overview
The street runs north from the western end of Beaumont Street and the northern end of Worcester Street by the main entrance of Worcester College. The Clarendon Institute building, which houses the Oxford Centre for Hebrew and Jewish Studies, is on the east side of the street. Somerville College, one of the former women-only colleges, also backs onto the street. The Oxford University Press (just south of the junction with Great Clarendon Street) and the original location of Ruskin College are on the west side of the street, the former Church of England parish church of Saint Paul on the east side is almost opposite the OUP and St Sepulchre's Cemetery is off the street to the west.

The Oxford University Press is a neoclassical building erected 1826–30. The central part was designed by Daniel Robertson and the north and west wings by Edward Blore. Modern extensions were added in 1960–61 and early in the 1970s.

The Freud café-bar stands opposite the Oxford University Press, and at the head of Great Clarendon Street. The bar, which was opened in 1988, is housed in a grand neoclassical building with an Ionic portico. This building was constructed as the Church of St Paul, the first Anglican parish church to be constructed in Oxford after the Reformation. The new church and parish was created to serve the growing community of Jericho. The building was designed by the architect H. J. Underwood and built in 1836. The architect E. G. Bruton added the apse in 1853 and F. C. Eden remodelled the interior in 1908. In the 20th century St Paul's became a redundant church and, after deconsecration, became a theatre and arts centre. In 1988 the building was acquired by Secession Ltd. to prevent its demolition and opened as Freud café-bar.

The Jericho Tavern is a public house and music venue at 56 Walton Street. In the late 1980s and early 1990s it was an important part of the music scene in Oxford, spawning the groups Ride, Radiohead and Supergrass.

The central part of Walton Street has changed significantly as more areas are developed by the University of Oxford. The former Radcliffe Infirmary site on the east side will become the Radcliffe Observatory Quarter, a large campus for humanities research and administration. The long wall separating the Infirmary from the street has been punctuated by a new pedestrian route to Woodstock Road and a health centre.

In 2015, a new controversial building for the Blavatnik School of Government of Oxford University on the Radcliffe Observatory Quarter site, designed by Herzog & de Meuron, was opened immediately opposite the Oxford University Press building, dominating the location with its height (taller than Carfax Tower), and resulting in further removal of the high stone wall behind the old Infirmary site. Exeter College is developing the Ruskin site opposite to the south for college accommodation.

Little Clarendon Street, a shopping street, links Walton Street with Saint Giles. There are numerous restaurants on Walton Street, often used by Oxford University students because of its central position, such as Branca, Loch Fyne, The Jericho Cafe, Arzoo, Brasserie Blanc (associated with the chef Raymond Blanc) and The Standard Tandoori.
Oxford's main independent art house cinema, the Phoenix Picturehouse, is on the west side of the street. A number of cocktail bars and pubs can be found on Walton Street.

Other shops include the speciality florist Daisies and Branca Delicatessen.

Northwards the street continues as Kingston Road through Walton Manor, at a junction with Walton Well Road to the northwest towards Port Meadow and St Bernard's Road to the east, linking with Woodstock Road. Near the northern end of Walton Street, Observatory Street also links Woodstock Road to the east.

Gallery

Adjoining streets

 Beaumont Street
 Great Clarendon Street
 Juxon Street
 Kingston Road
 Little Clarendon Street
 Observatory Street
 St Bernard's Road
 Walton Well Road
 Worcester Street

References

Sources and further reading

Streets in Oxford
Shopping streets in Oxford
Restaurant districts and streets in England
Oxford University Press
Worcester College, Oxford
Somerville College, Oxford
Ruskin College